Peri Baumeister  is a German TV and film actress best known in the UK for her role as Lady Gisela in series two and three of The Last Kingdom (2018) and as Sara in the 2019 Netflix television series Skylines and the vampire plane horror Blood Red Sky in 2021.

Career
Peri Baumeister is the daughter of the actor Edwin Noel-Baumeister and the cultural manager Judith Schäfer-Schuller. Her older half-sister Muriel Baumeister is also an actress. From 2007 to 2011, Peri Baumeister studied acting at the August Everding Prinzregententheater (Bavarian Theatre Academy) in Munich. During this time she appeared in stage productions of Lars von Trier's Dogville and Manderlay under the direction of Jochen Schölch at the Metropol-Theater (Munich). In her third year of study she received the leading role of Grete Trakl in the movie Tabu – It is the Soul of a Stranger on Earth at the side of Lars Eidinger. It was her cinematic debut, and she was awarded the prize for Best Young Actress at the Max Ophüls Film Festival in 2012. Baumeister then starred in Oliver Ziegenbalg's bestselling film Russian Disco.  For her role in the social drama  directed by Hermine Huntgeburth, she was nominated Best Supporting Actress at the German Academy of Television Awards. In the Norwegian TV six-parter The Heavy Water War about Hitler's attempts to develop an atomic bomb, she played the wife of physicist Werner Heisenberg.

In 2017, Baumeister made the switch to English-speaking audiences, starring in series two and three of The Last Kingdom as Lady Gisela, following this in 2019 with a regular main role in the Netflix television series Skylines as Sara. 

In 2021, Baumeister played the protagonist in the Peter Thorwarth directed Netflix vampire horror film Blood Red Sky.

Filmography

Film

Television

Awards and nominations

References

External 

 
 Gisela – Peri Baumeister

Actresses from Berlin
Living people
21st-century German actresses
German television actresses
German film actresses
Year of birth missing (living people)